Problem gambling or ludomania is repetitive gambling behavior despite harm and negative consequences. Problem gambling may be diagnosed as a mental disorder according to DSM-5 if certain diagnostic criteria are met. Pathological gambling is a common disorder associated with social and family costs.

The DSM-5 has re-classified the condition as an addictive disorder, with those affected exhibiting many similarities to those with substance addictions. The term gambling addiction has long been used in the recovery movement. Pathological gambling was long considered by the American Psychiatric Association to be an impulse-control disorder rather than an addiction. However, data suggest a closer relationship between pathological gambling and substance use disorders than exists between PG and obsessive–compulsive disorder, mainly because the behaviors in problem gambling and most primary substance use disorders (i.e., those not resulting from a desire to "self-medicate" for another condition such as depression) seek to activate the brain's reward mechanisms while the behaviors characterizing obsessive-compulsive disorder are prompted by overactive and misplaced signals from the brain's fear mechanisms.

Problem gambling is an addictive behavior with a high comorbidity with alcohol problems. A common tendency shared by people who have a gambling addiction is impulsivity.

Signs and symptoms
Research by governments in Australia led to a universal definition for that country which appears to be the only research-based definition not to use diagnostic criteria: "Problem gambling is characterized by many difficulties in limiting money and/or time spent on gambling which leads to adverse consequences for the gambler, others, or for the community." The University of Maryland Medical Center defines pathological gambling as "being unable to resist impulses to gamble, which can lead to severe personal or social consequences".

Most other definitions of problem gambling can usually be simplified to any gambling that causes harm to the gambler or someone else in any way; however, these definitions are usually coupled with descriptions of the type of harm or the use of diagnostic criteria. The DSM-V has since reclassified pathological gambling as gambling disorder and has listed the disorder under substance-related and addictive disorders rather than impulse-control disorders. This is due to the symptomatology of the disorder resembling an addiction not dissimilar to that of a substance use disorder. To be diagnosed, an individual must have at least four of the following symptoms in 12 months:
 Needs to gamble with increasing amounts of money to achieve the desired excitement
 Is restless or irritable when attempting to cut down or stop gambling
 Has made repeated unsuccessful efforts to control, cut back, or stop gambling
 Is often preoccupied with gambling (e.g., having persistent thoughts of reliving past gambling experiences, handicapping or planning the next venture, thinking of ways to get money with which to gamble)
 Often gambles when feeling distressed (e.g., helpless, guilty, anxious, depressed)
 After losing money gambling, often returns another day to get even ("chasing" one's losses)
 Lies to conceal the extent of involvement with gambling
 Has jeopardized or lost a significant relationship, job, education, or career opportunity because of gambling
 Relies on others to provide money to relieve desperate financial situations caused by gambling

Factors that lead to gambling addiction
Mayo Clinic specialists state that compulsive gambling may result from biological, genetic, and environmental factors, such as:
 mental health disorders (the presence of substance use disorders, personality disorders, emotional states)
 age and sex (usually found in youth or middle-aged people, and more common to men than women)
 impact of family or friends
 personality traits
 drugs with rare side-effects (for example, antipsychotic medications or dopamine agonists).

Other studies add the following triggers to the mentioned above:
 traumatic conditions
 job-related stress
 solitude
 other addictions

If not treated, problem gambling may cause severe and lasting effects on an individual's life:
 relationship-related issues
 problems with money, bankruptcy
 legal problems, imprisonment
 health problems
 suicide, including suicidal thoughts and attempts

Suicide rates
A gambler who does not receive treatment for pathological gambling when in a desperation phase may contemplate suicide. Problem gambling is often associated with increased suicidal ideation and attempts compared to the general population.

Early onset of problem gambling may increase the lifetime risk of suicide. Both comorbid substance use and comorbid mental disorders increase the risk of suicide in people with problem gambling. A 2010 Australian hospital study found that 17% of suicidal patients admitted to the Alfred Hospital's emergency department were problem gamblers.

Mechanisms

Biology
According to the Illinois Institute for Addiction Recovery, evidence indicates that pathological gambling is an addiction similar to chemical addiction. It has been observed that some pathological gamblers have lower levels of norepinephrine than normal gamblers. According to a study conducted by Alec Roy, formerly at the National Institute on Alcohol Abuse and Alcoholism, norepinephrine is secreted under stress, arousal, or thrill, so pathological gamblers gamble to make up for their under-dosage.

Studies have compared pathological gamblers to substance addicts, concluding that addicted gamblers display more physical symptoms during withdrawal.

Deficiencies in serotonin might also contribute to compulsive behavior, including a gambling addiction. There are three important points discovered after these antidepressant studies:
 Antidepressants can reduce pathological gambling when there is an effect on serotonergic reuptake inhibitors and 5-HT1/5-HT2 receptor antagonists.
 Pathological gambling, as part of obsessive-compulsive disorder, requires the higher doses of antidepressants as is usually required for depressive disorders.
 In cases where participants do not have or have minimal symptoms of anxiety or depression, antidepressants still have those effect.
A limited study was presented at a conference in Berlin, suggesting opioid release differs in problem gamblers from the general population, but in a very different way from people with a substance use disorder.

The findings in one review indicated the sensitization theory is responsible. Dopamine dysregulation syndrome has been observed in the aforementioned theory in people with regard to such activities as gambling.

Some medical authors suggest that the biomedical model of problem gambling may be unhelpful because it focuses only on individuals. These authors point out that social factors may be a far more important determinant of gambling behavior than brain chemicals, and they suggest that a social model may be more useful in understanding the issue. For example, an apparent increase in problem gambling in the UK may be better understood as a consequence of changes in legislation which came into force in 2007 and enabled casinos, bookmakers, and online betting sites to advertise on TV and radio for the first time and which eased restrictions on the opening of betting shops and online gambling sites.

Pathological gambling is similar to many other impulse-control disorders such as kleptomania. According to evidence from both community- and clinic-based studies, individuals who are pathological gamblers are highly likely to exhibit other psychiatric problems concurrently, including substance use disorders, mood and anxiety disorders, or personality disorders.

Pathological gambling shows several similarities with substance use disorders. There is a partial overlap in diagnostic criteria; pathological gamblers are also likely to have a substance use disorder. The "telescoping phenomenon" reflects the rapid development from initial to problematic behavior in women compared with men. This phenomenon was initially described for alcoholism, but it has also been applied to pathological gambling. Also, biological data support a relationship between pathological gambling and substance use disorder. A comprehensive UK Gambling Commission study from 2018 has also hinted at the link between gambling addiction and a reduction in physical activity, poor diet, and overall well-being. The study links problem gambling to a myriad of issues affecting relationships, and social stability.

Psychological
Several psychological mechanisms are thought to be implicated in the development and maintenance of problem gambling. First, reward processing seems to be less sensitive with problem gamblers. Second, some individuals use problem gambling as an escape from the problems in their lives (an example of negative reinforcement). Third, personality factors such as narcissism, risk-seeking, sensation-seeking, and impulsivity play a role. Fourth, problem gamblers have several cognitive biases, including the illusion of control, unrealistic optimism, overconfidence and the gambler's fallacy (the incorrect belief that a series of random events tends to self-correct so that the absolute frequencies of each of various outcomes balance each other out). Fifth, problem gamblers represent a chronic state of a behavioral spin process, a gambling spin, as described by the criminal spin theory.

Spain's gambling watchdog has updated its 2019–2020 Responsible Gaming Program, classifying problem gambling as a mental disorder.

Diagnosis
The most common instrument used to screen for "probable pathological gambling" behavior is the South Oaks Gambling Screen (SOGS) developed by Lesieur and Blume (1987) at the South Oaks Hospital in New York City. In recent years the use of SOGS has declined due to a number of criticisms, including that it overestimates false positives (Battersby, Tolchard, Thomas & Esterman, 2002).

The DSM-IV diagnostic criteria presented as a checklist is an alternative to SOGS, it focuses on the psychological motivations underpinning problem gambling and was developed by the American Psychiatric Association. It consists of ten diagnostic criteria. One frequently used screening measure based upon the DSM-IV criteria is the National Opinion Research Center DSM Screen for Gambling Problems (NODS). The Canadian Problem Gambling Inventory (CPGI) and the Victorian Gambling Screen (VGS) are newer assessment measures. The Problem Gambling Severity Index, which focuses on the harms associated with problem gambling, is composed of nine items from the longer CPGI. The VGS is also harm based and includes 15 items. The VGS has proven validity and reliability in population studies as well as Adolescents and clinic gamblers.

Treatment
Most treatment for problem gambling involves counseling, step-based programs, self-help, peer-support, medication, or a combination of these. However, no one treatment is considered to be most efficacious and, in the United States, no medications have been approved for the treatment of pathological gambling by the U.S. Food and Drug Administration (FDA).

Gamblers Anonymous (GA) is a commonly used treatment for gambling problems. Modeled after Alcoholics Anonymous, GA is a twelve-step program that emphasizes a mutual-support approach. There are three in-patient treatment centers in North America. One form of counseling, cognitive behavioral therapy (CBT) has been shown to reduce symptoms and gambling-related urges. This type of therapy focuses on the identification of gambling-related thought processes, mood and cognitive distortions that increase one's vulnerability to out-of-control gambling. Additionally, CBT approaches frequently utilize skill-building techniques geared toward relapse prevention, assertiveness and gambling refusal, problem solving and reinforcement of gambling-inconsistent activities and interests.

As to behavioral treatment, some recent research supports the use of both activity scheduling and desensitization in the treatment of gambling problems. In general, behavior analytic research in this area is growing There is evidence that the SSRI paroxetine is efficacious in the treatment of pathological gambling. Additionally, for patients with both pathological gambling and a comorbid bipolar spectrum condition, sustained-release lithium has shown efficacy in a preliminary trial. The opioid antagonist drug nalmefene has also been trialled quite successfully for the treatment of compulsive gambling. Group concepts based on CBT, such as the metacognitive training for problem gambling have also proven effective.

Step-based programs
12 Step–based programs such as Gamblers Anonymous are specific to gambling and generic to healing addiction, creating financial health, and improving mental wellness. Commercial alternatives that are designed for clinical intervention, using the best of health science and applied education practices, have been used as patient-centered tools for intervention since 2007. They include measured efficacy and resulting recovery metrics.

Motivational interviewing
Motivational interviewing is one of the treatments of compulsive gambling. The motivational interviewer's basic goal is promoting readiness to change through thinking and resolving mixed feelings. Avoiding aggressive confrontation, argument, labeling, blaming, and direct persuasion, the interviewer supplies empathy and advice to compulsive gamblers who define their own goal. The focus is on promoting freedom of choice and encouraging confidence in the ability to change.

Peer support
A growing method of treatment is peer support. With the advancement of online gambling, many gamblers experiencing issues use various online peer-support groups to aid their recovery. This protects their anonymity while allowing them to attempt recovery on their own, often without having to disclose their issues to loved ones.

Self-help
Research into self-help for problem gamblers has shown benefits. A study by Wendy Slutske of the University of Missouri concluded one-third of pathological gamblers overcome it by natural recovery.

Anti-addiction drugs

Self-exclusion

Gambling self-exclusion (voluntary exclusion) programs are available in the US, the UK, Canada, Australia, South Africa, France, and other countries. They seem to help some (but not all) problem gamblers to gamble less often.

Some experts maintain that casinos in general arrange for self-exclusion programs as a public relations measure without actually helping many of those with problem gambling issues. A campaign of this type merely "deflects attention away from problematic products and industries", according to Natasha Dow Schull, a cultural anthropologist at New York University and author of the book Addiction by Design.

There is also a question as to the effectiveness of such programs, which can be difficult to enforce. In the province of Ontario, Canada, for example, the Self-Exclusion program operated by the government's Ontario Lottery and Gaming Corporation (OLG) is not effective, according to investigation conducted by the television series, revealed in late 2017. |"Gambling addicts ... said that while on the ... self-exclusion list, they entered OLG properties on a regular basis" in spite of the facial recognition technology in place at the casinos, according to the Canadian Broadcasting Corporation. As well, a CBC journalist who tested the system found that he was able to enter Ontario casinos and gamble on four distinct occasions, in spite of having been registered and photographed for the self-exclusion program. An OLG spokesman provided this response when questioned by the CBC: "We provide supports to self-excluders by training our staff, by providing disincentives, by providing facial recognition, by providing our security officers to look for players. No one element is going to be foolproof because it is not designed to be foolproof".

Impact (Australia)
According to the Productivity Commission's 2010 final report into gambling, the social cost of problem gambling is close to 4.7 billion dollars a year. Some of the harms resulting from problem gambling include depression, suicide, lower work productivity, job loss, relationship breakdown, crime and bankruptcy.<ref name="auto">Productivity Commission Inquiry Report, Gambling, Vol 1, 2010</</ref> A survey conducted in 2008 found that the most common motivation for fraud was problem gambling, with each incident averaging a loss of $1.1 million. According to Darren R. Christensen. Nicki A. Dowling, Alun C. Jackson and Shane A. Thomas, a survey done from 1994 to 2008 in Tasmania gave results that gambling participation rates have risen rather than fallen over this period.

Prevalence

Europe
In Europe, the rate of problem gambling is typically 0.5 to 3 percent. The "British Gambling Prevalence Survey 2007", conducted by the United Kingdom Gambling Commission, found approximately 0.6 percent of the adult population had problem gambling issues—the same percentage as in 1999. The highest prevalence of problem gambling was found among those who participated in spread betting (14.7%), fixed odds betting terminals (11.2%), and betting exchanges (9.8%). In Norway, a December 2007 study showed the amount of current problem gamblers was 0.7 percent.

With gambling addiction on the rise worldwide and across Europe in particular, those calling gambling a disease have been gaining grounds. The UK Gambling Commission announced a significant shift in their approach to gambling through their reclassification of gambling as a disease, and therefore that it should be addressed adequately by the NHS.

The World Health Organization has also classified gambling a disease. In its 72nd World Health Assembly held on Saturday, May 25, 2019, ‘gaming disorder’ was recognized as an official illness. The 194-member meet added excessive gaming to a classified list of diseases as it revised its International Statistical Classification of Diseases and Related Health Problems (ICD-11).

North America
Lizbeth García Quevedo, director of the Coordination with Federal Entities (CONADIC), spoke of pathological gambling as a strong addiction in Mexico: "It has very similar behaviors, that is why some experts consider it an addiction because it is similar in the behaviors, in the origins, some risk factors that can trigger pathological gambling, it can also trigger drug consumption". In Mexico there could be between one and three million people addicted to gambling. "They should be aware of what their children are doing, and on the other hand, they should motivate pro-active gambling, healthy gambling", commented Lizbeth García Quevedo.  The Ministry of Health document highlights that a study on pathological gambling that analyzed 46 studies carried out in Canada, the United States, Australia, Sweden, Norway, England, Switzerland and Spain, revealed that the prevalence of pathological gambling is relatively higher among adolescents, which shows the continuity of the problem considering that many pathological gamblers state that they started their gambling behavior at an early age.

In the United States, the percentage of pathological gamblers was 0.6 percent, and the percentage of problem gamblers was 2.3 percent in 2008. Studies commissioned by the National Gambling Impact Study Commission Act has shown the prevalence rate ranges from 0.1 percent to 0.6 percent. Nevada has the highest percentage of pathological gambling; a 2002 report estimated 2.2 to 3.6 percent of Nevada residents over the age of 18 could be called problem gamblers. Also, 2.7 to 4.3 percent could be called probable pathological gamblers.

According to a 1997 meta-analysis by Harvard Medical School's division on addictions, 1.1 percent of the adult population of the United States and Canada could be called pathological gamblers. A 1996 study estimated 1.2 to 1.9 percent of adults in Canada were pathological. In Ontario, a 2006 report showed 2.6 percent of residents experienced "moderate gambling problems" and 0.8 percent had "severe gambling problems". In Quebec, an estimated 0.8 percent of the adult population were pathological gamblers in 2002. Although most who gamble do so without harm, approximately 6 million American adults are addicted to gambling.

According to a survey of 11th and 12th graders in Wood County, Ohio found that the percentage who reported being unable to control their gambling rose to 8.3 percent in 2022, up from just 4.2 percent in 2018. The reasons for the increase cited, are the time spent online during the COVID-19 pandemic, gambling-like elements put into video games, and the increased legalization of sports betting in a number of U.S. states.

Signs of a gambling problem include:
 Using income or savings to gamble while letting bills go unpaid
 Repeated unsuccessful attempts to stop gambling
 Chasing losses
 Losing sleep over thoughts of gambling
 Arguing with friends or family about gambling behavior
 Feeling depressed or suicidal because of gambling losses

South America 
For Isabel Sánchez Sosa, coordinator of the Compulsive Gamblers Association of Argentina, "gambling addiction is growing a lot in the country because the offer is impressive" and in this sense she asserted that the presence of bingos is a common issue in all neighborhoods. In the province of Buenos Aires there are 46 bingos.

Oceania (Australia)
Casinos and poker machines in pubs and clubs facilitate problem gambling in Australia. The building of new hotels and casinos has been described as "one of the most active construction markets in Australia"; for example, AUD$860 million was allocated to rebuild and expand the Star Complex in Sydney.

A 2010 study, conducted in the Northern Territory by researchers from the Australian National University (ANU) and Southern Cross University (SCU), found that the proximity of a person's residence to a gambling venue is significant in terms of prevalence. Harmful gambling in the study was prevalent among those living within 100 metres of any gambling venue, and was over 50% higher than among those living ten kilometres from a venue. The study's data stated:

Specifically, people who lived 100 metres from their favourite venue visited an estimated average of 3.4 times per month. This compared to an average of 2.8 times per month for people living one kilometre away, and 2.2 times per month for people living ten kilometres away.

According to the Productivity Commission's 2016 report into gambling, 0.5% to 1% (80,000 to 160,000) of the Australian adult population had significant problems resulting from gambling. A further 1.4% to 2.1% (230,000 to 350,000) of the Australian adult population experienced moderate risks making them likely to be vulnerable to problem gambling. Estimates show that problem gamblers account for an average of 41% of the total gaming machine spending.

See also
 Gamblers Anonymous
 Gambler's Lament, an ancient poem about gambling
 Gambling Commission (Great Britain)
 GamCare
 Gaming law
 National Council on Problem Gambling (Singapore)
 National Council on Problem Gambling (United States)
 Problem Gambling Foundation of New Zealand
 Video game addiction

References

External links

Behavioral addiction
Gambling and society
Habit and impulse disorders